Prizren is the second most populous city and municipality of Kosovo and seat of the eponymous municipality and district. It is located on the banks of the Prizren River between the foothills of the Šar Mountains in southern Kosovo. Prizren experiences an oceanic climate under the influence of the surrounding mountains.

Prizren is constitutionally designated as the historical capital of the country. Archaeological excavations in Prizren Fortress indicate that its fortress area has seen habitation and use since the Bronze Age. Prizren has been traditionally identified with the settlement of Theranda in Roman Dardania, although other locations have been suggested in recent research. In late antiquity it was part of the defensive fortification system in western Dardania and the fort was reconstructed in the era of eastern Roman Emperor Justinian. Byzantine rule in the region ended definitively in 1219-20 as the Serbian Nemanjić dynasty controlled the fort and the town until 1371. Since 1371, a series of regional feudal rulers came to control Prizren: the Balšić, the Dukagjini, the Hrebeljanović and finally the Branković, often with Ottoman support. The Ottoman Empire assumed direct control after 1450. Prizren first developed in the area below the fortress which overlooks the Bistrica river on its left bank. Since the 16th century, economic development fueled the expansion of the city's neighbourhoods to the river's right bank.

Name
The name of the city has been linked with that of Petrizen, a fort in Dardania mentioned by Procopius in the 6th century.

History

Early period 

The earliest archaeological find is the so-called Runner of Prizren which is a bronze figure of a running girl.  A dealer sold it to the British Museum in 1876. According to the museum, the object was possibly made in Sparta between 520BC and 500BC. It may have arrived in Prizren as a gift or loot and used as a grave-god.

Prizren has been traditionally identified with Theranda, a town of the Roman era. Another location which may have been that of Theranda is present-day Suva Reka as has been suggested in recent research. Archaeological research has shown that the site of the Prizren Fortress has had several eras of habitation since prehistoric times. In its lower part, material from the upper part of the fort has been deposited over the centuries. It dates from the Middle Bronze Age (c. 2000 BCE) to the late Iron Age (c. 1st century CE) and is comparable to the material found in the nearby prehistoric site in the village of Vlashnjë (~10 km west of Prizren). In 2005, prehistoric rock paintings in a ritual site related to the cycle of life were found near Vlashnjë. They represent the first find of prehistoric rock art in the region.

In late antiquity, the fortification saw a phase of reconstruction. It is part of a series of forts that were built or reconstructed in the same period by Justinian along the White Drin in northern Albania and western Kosovo in the routes that linked the coastal areas with the Kosovo valley. At this time, the Prizren fortress likely appears in historical record as Petrizen in the 6th century CE in the work of Procopius as one of the fortifications which Justinian commissioned to be reconstructed in Dardania.

Middle Ages
In 1330, Serbian king Stefan Dečanski explicitly mentioned the presence of Albanians and the Albanian names of villages in Kosovo, in particular in the districts of Prizren and that of Skopje. A chrisobull of the Serbian Tsar Stefan Dušan that was given to the Monastery of Saint Mihail and Gavril in Prizren between the years of 1348-1353 states the presence of Albanians in the vicinity of Prizren, the Plains of Metohija and in the villages of Drenica. Within this chrisobull, nine Albanian stock-breeding villages within the vicinity of Prizren are mentioned explicitly - these villages are known with the names Gjinovci (Gjinajt), Magjerci, Bjellogllavci (Kryebardhët), Flokovci (Flokajt), Crnça, Caparci (Çaparajt), Gjonovci (Gjonajt), Shpinadinci (Shpinajt) and Novaci. Entire Albanian villages were gifted by Serbian kings, particularly Stefan Dušan, as presents to Serb monasteries within Prizren, Deçan and Tetova. Additionally, people with Albanian anthroponomy are repeatedly mentioned in a 1348 chrysobull of Stefan Dušan that lists those who pray at the monastery of St. Michael and Gabriel in Prizren as well as some of the inhabitants of the city itself and the surrounding villages. In one of Stefan Dušan's documents in 1355, a soldier with Albanian anthroponomy is exclusively mentioned as one of the people who must continuously pay the Monastery of St. Nicholas in the village of Billushë near Prizren.

Konstantin Jireček concluded, from the correspondence of archbishop Demetrios of Ohrid (1216–36), that Prizren was the northeasternmost area of Albanian settlement prior to the Slavic expansion that began in the 6th century.

Present-day Prizren is first mentioned in 1019 at the time of Basil II (r. 976–1025) in the form of Prisdriana. In 1072, the leaders of the Bulgarian Uprising of Georgi Voiteh traveled from their center in Skopje in the area of Prizren and held a meeting in which they invited Mihailo Vojislavljević of Duklja to send them assistance. Mihailo sent his son, Constantine Bodin with 300 of his soldiers. Dalassenos Doukas, dux of Bulgaria was sent against the combined forced but was defeated near Prizren, which was extensively plundered by the Serbian army after the battle. The Bulgarian magnates proclaimed Bodin "Emperor of the Bulgarians" after this initial victory. They were defeated by Nikephoros Bryennios in the area of northern Macedonia by the end of 1072. The area was raided by Serbian ruler Vukan in the 1090s. Demetrios Chomatenos is the last Byzantine archbishop of Ohrid to include Prizren in his jurisdiction until 1219. Stefan Nemanja had seized the surrounding area along the White Drin between the 1180s and 1190s, but this may refer to the areas Prizren diocese rather than the fort and the settlement itself and he may have lost control of them later. The ecclesiastical split of Prizren from the Patriarchate of Constantinople in 1219 was the final act of establishing Serbian Nemanjić rule in the town. Prizren and its fort were the administrative and economic center of the župa of Podrimlje (in Albanian, Podrima or Anadrini). The old town of Prizren developed below the fortress along the left bank of the Bistrica/Lumbardhi. Ragusan traders were stationed in the old town. Prizren over time became a trading hub and gateway for Ragusan trade towards eastern Kosovo and beyond.
In this period Stefan Dušan founded and was buried in the Monastery of the Holy Archangels in Prizren, under his rule Serbia reached its territorial, political, economic, and cultural peak.

With the death of Stefan Uroš V in 1371, a series of competing regional nobles sieged, counter-sieged and held control of Prizren - increasingly with Ottoman support and intervention. The first who tried to gain control of Prizren and the trade that passed through the town was Prince Marko, but after his defeat in the Battle of Maritsa, the Balšići of Zeta quickly moved to take Prizren soon after the battle in the fall and winter of 1371. In the spring of 1372, Nikola Altomanović besieged Prizren and tried to expand his rule, but was defeated. The death George Balšić in 1377 created another power vacuum - Đurađ Branković took over Prizren for the first time at that time.

The Catholic church retained some influence in the area; 14th-century documents refer to a catholic church in Prizren, which was the seat of a bishopric between the 1330s and 1380s. Catholic parishes served Ragusan merchants and Saxon miners.

Ottoman Period 

After several years of attack and counterattack, the Ottomans made a major invasion of Kosovo in 1454; Attempts of liberating the Prizren area earlier by Skanderbeg and thereafter by John Hunyadi have failed, as Đurađ Branković was an Ottoman vassal at this time and did not grant passage into Kosovo for the Crusaders to fight the Ottomans. On 21 June 1455, Prizren surrendered to the Ottoman army. Prizren was the capital of the Sanjak of Prizren, and under new administrative organization of Ottoman Empire it became capital of the Vilayet. This included the city of Tetovo. Later it became part of the larger Rumelia Eyalet. It was a prosperous trade city, benefiting from its position on the north-south and east-west trade routes across the Empire. Prizren became one of the larger cities of the Ottomans' Kosovo Province (vilayet).

In the Ottoman Defter of 1591, the city of Prizren itself was recorded within the Sanjak of Prizren - this includes the household heads of the city. By this time, Prizren had been significantly Islamised, as reflected by the anthroponomy of the inhabitants; several cases of Muslim inhabitants with mixtures of Muslim and Albanian anthroponomy exist (i.e. Ali Gjoci, Hasan Gjinaj, Ferhad Reçi, Hasan Bardi...). The Muslim neighbourhoods (Mahalla/Mëhalla) consisted of Xhamia e Vjetër (Old Mosque, 53 homes), Levisha (50 homes), Ajas beu (15 homes), Haxhi Kasem (48 homes), Jazixhi Sinani (71 homes), Çarshia (also called Jakub beu, 18 homes), Kurila (31 homes) and Mëhalla e lëkurëpunuesve (neighbourhood of the leatherworkers, 34 homes). The Christian neighbourhoods (Mahalla/Mëhalla) consisted of Pazari i Vjetër (Old Market, 8 homes), Madhiq (37 homes), Vasil (27 homes), Kodha (13 homes), Çarshia/Pjetri Nikolla (14 homes), Bogoi Riber (11 homes), Radmir (51 homes), Jazixhi Sinani (mentioned beforehand, 24 homes), Pandelja (29 homes), Prend Vriça (9 homes) and Ajas (13 homes). The neighbourhoods of Pandelja, Jazixhi Sinani and Kodha were dominated by inhabitants with characteristically Albanian anthroponomy; the other neighbourhoods saw a blend between predominantly Slavic/Slavic-Albanian (or rather, Orthodox) anthroponomy.

Albanian Renaissance 

Prizren was the cultural and intellectual centre of Ottoman Kosovo. It was dominated by its Muslim population, who composed over 70% of its population in 1857. The city became a major Albanian cultural centre and the coordination political and cultural capital of the Kosovar Albanians. In 1871, a long Serbian seminary was opened in Prizren, discussing the possible joining of the old Serbia's territories with the Principality of Serbia.
It was an important part of Kosovo Vilayet between 1877 and 1912.

During the late 19th century the city became a focal point for Albanian nationalism and saw the creation in 1878 of the League of Prizren, a movement formed to seek the national unification and autonomy of Albanians within the Ottoman Empire. The Young Turk Revolution was a step in the dissolving of the Ottoman empire that led to the Balkan Wars. The Third Army (Ottoman Empire) had a division in Prizren, the 30th Reserve Infantry Division (Otuzuncu Pirzerin Redif Fırkası).

Modern 

The Prizren attachment was part of the İpek Detachment in the Order of Battle, 19 October 1912 in the First Balkan War. During the First Balkan War the city was invaded by the Serbian army and incorporated into the Kingdom of Serbia. Although the troops met little resistance, the takeover was bloody with 400 people dead in the first few days; the local population would call the city 'The Kingdom of Death'. The Daily Chronicle reported on 12 November 1912 that 5,000 Albanians had been slaughtered in Prizren. General Božidar Janković forced the local Albanian leaders to sign a declaration of gratitude to King Peter of Serbia for their 'liberation by the Serbian army.' Following the capture of Prizren, most foreigners were barred from entering the city, for the Montenegrin forces temporarily closed the city before full control was restored. A few visitors did make it through—including Leon Trotsky, then working as a journalist for a Ukrainian newspaper and reports eventually emerged of widespread killings of Albanians. In a 1912 news report on the Serbian Army and the Paramilitary Chetniks in Prizren, Trotsky stated "Among them were intellectuals, men of ideas, nationalist zealots, but these were isolated individuals. The rest were just thugs, robbers who had joined the army for the sake of loot... The Serbs in Old Serbia, in their national endeavour to correct data in the ethnographical statistics that are not quite favourable to them, are engaged quite simply in systematic extermination of the Muslim population". British traveller Edith Durham and a British military attaché were supposed to visit Prizren in October 1912, however the trip was prevented by the authorities. Durham stated " I asked wounded Montengrins [Soldiers] why I was not allowed to go and they laughed and said 'We have not left a nose on an Albanian up there!' Not a pretty sight for a British officer." Eventually Durham visited a northern Albanian outpost in Kosovo where she met captured Ottoman soldiers whose upper lips and noses had been cut off.

After the First Balkan War of 1912, the Conference of Ambassadors in London allowed the creation of the state of Albania and handed Kosovo to the Kingdom of Serbia, even though the population of Kosovo remained mostly Albanian.

In 1913, an official Austro-Hungarian report recorded that 30,000 people had fled to Prizren from Bosnia. In January 1914 the Austro-Hungarian consul based in Prizren conducted a detailed report on living conditions in the city. The report stated that Kingdom of Serbia didn't keep its promise for equal treatment of Albanians and Muslims. Thirty of the thirty-two Mosques in Prizren had been turned into hay barns, ammunition stores and military barracks. The people of the city were heavily taxed with Muslims and Catholic Christians having to pay more tax than Orthodox Christians. The local government was predominately made up of former Serb Chetniks. The report also noted that the Serbs were also dissatisfied with the living conditions in Prizren.

World War I and World War II 

With the outbreak of the First World War, the Kingdom of Serbia was invaded by Austro-Hungarian forces and later by Bulgarian forces. By 29 November 1915, Prizren fell to Bulgarian and Austro-Hungarian forces. In April 1916, Austria-Hungary allowed the Kingdom of Bulgaria to occupy the city with the understanding that a significant amount of the city's population were ethnic Bulgarians. During this period there was a process of forced Bulgarisation with many Serbs being interned; Serbs suffered worse in Bulgarian occupied regions of Kosovo compared to Austrian occupied regions due to the Bulgarian defeat in the Second Balkan War and due to the long-standing rivalry between the Bulgarian Orthodox Church and the Serbian Orthodox Church. According to Catholic Archbishop of Skopje, Lazër Mjeda who was taking refuge in Prizren at the time, roughly 1,000 people had died of hunger in 1917. In October 1918 following the fall of Macedonia to Allied Forces, the Serbian Army along with the French 11th colonial division and the Italian 35th Division pushed the Austro-Hungarian and Bulgarian forces out of the city. By the end of 1918, the Kingdom of Serbs, Croats and Slovenes was formed. The Kingdom was renamed in 1929 to the Kingdom of Yugoslavia and Prizren became a part of its Vardar Banovina.

In World War II Nazi Germany and Fascist Italy invaded the Kingdom of Yugoslavia on 6 April 1941 and by 9 April the Germans who had invaded Yugoslavia from the East with neighbouring Bulgaria as base were on the outskirts of Prizren and by 14 April Prizren had fallen to the Italians who had invaded Yugoslavia from the West in neighbouring Albania; there was however notable resistance in Prizren before Yugoslavia unconditionally surrendered on 19 April 1941. Prizren along with most of Kosovo was annexed to the Italian puppet state of Albania. Soon after the Italian occupation, the Albanian Fascist Party established a blackshirt battalion in Prizren, but plans to establish two more battalions were dropped due to the lack of public support.

In 1943 Bedri Pejani of the German Wehrmacht helped create the Second League of Prizren.

Federal Yugoslavia 

In 1944, German forces were driven out of Kosovo by a combined Russian-Bulgarian force, and then the Communist government of Yugoslavia took control. In 1946, the town was formulated as a part of Kosovo and Metohija which the Constitution defined the Autonomous Region of Kosovo and Metohija within the People's Republic of Serbia, a constituent state of the Federal People's Republic of Yugoslavia.

The Province was renamed to Socialist Autonomous Province of Kosovo in 1974, remaining part of the Socialist Republic of Serbia, but having attributions similar to a Socialist Republic within the Socialist Federal Republic of Yugoslavia. The former status was restored in 1989, and officially in 1990.

For many years after the restoration of Serbian rule, Prizren and the region of Dečani to the west remained centres of Albanian nationalism. In 1956 the Yugoslav secret police put on trial in Prizren nine Kosovo Albanians accused of having been infiltrated into the country by the (hostile) Communist Albanian regime of Enver Hoxha. The "Prizren trial" became something of a cause célèbre after it emerged that a number of leading Yugoslav Communists had allegedly had contacts with the accused. The nine accused were all convicted and sentenced to long prison sentences, but were released and declared innocent in 1968 with Kosovo's assembly declaring that the trial had been "staged and mendacious."

Kosovo War 

The town of Prizren did not suffer much during the Kosovo War but its surrounding municipality was badly affected 1998–1999. Before the war, the Organization for Security and Co-operation in Europe estimated that the municipality's population was about 78% Kosovo Albanian, 5% Serb and 17% from other national communities. During the war most of the Albanian population were either forced or intimidated into leaving the town. Tusus Neighborhood suffered the most. Some twenty-seven to thirty-four people were killed and over one hundred houses were burned.

At the end of the war in June 1999, most of the Albanian population returned to Prizren. Serbian and Roma minorities fled, with the OSCE estimating that 97% of Serbs and 60% of Romani had left Prizren by October. The community is now predominantly ethnically Albanian, but other minorities such as Turkish, Ashkali (a minority declaring itself as Albanian Roma) and Bosniak (including Torbesh community) live there as well, be that in the city itself, or in villages around. Such locations include Sredska, Mamushë, the region of Gora, etc. 

Much of Potkaljaja, the old Serb neighbourhood along the hillside in the centre of town, was looted and burned to the ground following the Yugoslav Army withdrawal. Since 2010 most of the neighbourhood has been rebuild.

The war and its aftermath caused only a moderate amount of damage to the city compared to other cities in Kosovo. Serbian forces destroyed an important Albanian cultural monument in Prizren, the League of Prizren building, but the complex was rebuilt later on and now constitutes the Albanian League of Prizren Museum.

On 17 March 2004, during the Unrest in Kosovo some Serb cultural monuments in Prizren were damaged, burned or destroyed, including Orthodox Serb churches, such as Our Lady of Ljeviš from 1307 (UNESCO World Heritage Site), the Church of Holy Salvation, Church of St. George (the city's largest church), Church of St. George (Runjevac), Church of St. Kyriaki, Church of St. Nicolas (Tutić Church), the Monastery of The Holy Archangels, as well as Prizren's Orthodox seminary of Saint Cyrillus and Methodius.

Also, during that riot, entire Serb quarter of Prizren, near the Prizren Fortress, was completely destroyed, as a revenge for the crimes committed during the war from the serbian army and all remaining Serb population was evicted from Prizren. Simultaneously Islamic cultural heritage and Mosques were destroyed and damaged.

21st century 

The municipality of Prizren is still the most culturally and ethnically heterogeneous of Kosovo, retaining communities of Bosniaks, Turks, and Romani in addition to the majority Kosovo Albanian population live in Prizren. Only a small number of Kosovo Serbs remains in Prizren and area, residing mainly in small villages. Furthermore, Prizren's Turkish community is socially prominent and influential, and the Turkish language is widely spoken even by non-ethnic Turks.

Geography 

Prizren is located on the foothills of the Šar Mountains in southern Kosovo on the banks of Prizren River. Prizren Mnicipality borders Albania to the southwest and North Macedonia to the southeast.

Climate 

Governance 

Prizren is a municipality governed by a mayor–council system. The mayor of Prizren with the members of the Prizren Municipal Council are responsible for the administration of Prizren Municipality. The municipality is encompassed in Prizren District and consists of 76 adjacent settlements with Prizren as its seat.

International relations 

Prizren is twinned with Amasya, Balıkesir, Berat, Beykoz, Bingen am Rhein, Herceg Novi, Karşıyaka, Kavarna, Kyjov and Osijek. Turkey has also a general consulate in Prizren.

Economy 

For a long time the economy of Kosovo was based on the retail industry fueled by remittance income coming from a large number of immigrant communities in Western Europe. Private enterprise, mostly small business, is slowly emerging. Private businesses, like elsewhere in Kosovo, predominantly face difficulties because of a lack of structural capacity to grow.  Education is poor, financial institutions basic, and regulatory institutions lack experience.  Securing capital investment from foreign entities cannot emerge in such an environment. Due to financial hardships, several companies and factories have closed and others are reducing personnel. This general economic downturn contributes directly to the growing rate of unemployment and poverty, making the economic viability in the region more tenuous.

Many restaurants, private retail stores, and service-related businesses operate out of small shops. Larger grocery and department stores have recently opened. In town, there are eight sizeable markets, including three produce markets, one car market, one cattle market, and three personal hygiene and houseware markets. There is an abundance of
kiosks selling small goods. However, reducing international presence and repatriation of refugees and internally displaced persons is expected to further strain the local economy. Market saturation, high unemployment, and a reduction of financial remittances from abroad are negative economic indicators.

There are three agricultural co-operatives in three villages. Most livestock breeding and agricultural production are private, informal, and small-scale. There are nine operational banks with branches in Prizren, ProCredit Bank, the Raiffeisen Bank, the NLB Bank, TEB Bank, Banka për Biznes (Bank for Business), İşbank, Banka Kombëtare Tregtare (National Trade Bank), Iutecredit, and the Payment and Banking Authority of Kosovo (BPK).

Infrastructure 

All the main roads connecting the major villages with the urban centre are asphalted. The water supply is functional in Prizren town and in approximately 30 villages.

Education 

There are 48 primary schools with 28,205 pupils and 1,599 teachers; 6 secondary schools with 9,608 students and 503 teachers; kindergartens are privately run. There is also a public university in Prizren, offering lectures in Albanian, Bosnian, and Turkish. 
(source: municipal directorate of education and science).

Health 
The primary health care system includes 14 municipal family health centres and 26 health houses. The primary health sector has 475 employees, including doctors, nurses and support staff, 264 female and 211 male. Regional hospital in Prizren offers services to approximately 250,000 residents. The hospital employs 778 workers, including 155 doctors, and is equipped with emergency and intensive care units.

Demography 

As of the Kosovo Agency of Statistics (KAS) estimate from the 2011 census, there were 177,781 people residing in Prizren Municipality, representing the second most populous city and municipality of Kosovo. Its urban population was approximately 94,500, while the rural population was around 83,000. With a population density of 283,5 people per square kilometre, Prizren is among the most densely populated municipalities of Kosovo.

In terms of ethnicity, as of the 2011 census, Prizren Municipality was 82% Albanian, 9.50% Bosniak, 5.11% Turkish, 1.63% Romani, 0.76% Ashkali, 0.37% Gorani, 0.13% Serbian, 0.09 Egyptian and 0.34% of unknown ethnicity. By religion, there were 170,640 (95.98%) Muslims, 5,999 (3.37%) Roman Catholics, 250 (0.14%) Orthodox, 807 (0.45%) of other religions and 85 (0.05%) irreligious. By language, 82.68% of the population spoke Albanian as their first language. Other spoken languages include Bosnian (10.16%), Turkish (5.78%), Romani (0.55%), Serbian (0.21%) and other languages (0.62%). Besides the two official languages of Kosovo, Albanian and Serbian, Bosnian and Turkish are also the official languages of Prizren Municipality.

The presence of Vlach villages in the vicinity of Prizren is attested in 1198-1199 by a charter of Stephan Nemanja. Madgearu argues that the series of Ottoman defters from 1455 onward showing the "ethnic mosaic" of Serb and Albanian villages in Kosovo shows that Prizren already had significant Albanian Muslim populations. Since an early period in its rapid development as an Ottoman city, Prizren had much more Muslims than Catholic or Orthodox inhabitants as in the pre-Ottoman period. This is highlighted in primary accounts of the 16th and early 17th century. Catholic bishop Pjetër Mazreku noted in 1624 that the Catholics of Prizren were 200, the Serbs (Orthodox) 600, and Muslims, almost all of whom were Albanians, numbered 12,000.

Due to urban development in the Ottoman period, with the building of mosques and other Islamic buildings, Prizren received an Islamic urban character in the 16th century. 227 of 246 workshops of Prizren were run by Muslims in 1571. Catholic archbishop Marino Bizzi reported in 1610 that Prizren had 8,600 houses, out of which many were Orthodox (who had two churches), and only 30 were Catholic (who had one church). The Orthodox far outnumbered the Catholics. Catholic archbishop Pjetër Mazreku reported in 1624 that the town was inhabited by 12,000 "Turks" (Muslims) of which most spoke Albanian, and that there were 600 Serbs (Orthodox Christians) and maybe 200 Catholic Albanians. In 1857, Russian Slavist Alexander Hilferding's publications place the Muslim families at 3,000, the Orthodox ones at 900 and the Catholics at around 100 families. In the Ottoman census of 1876, it had 43,922 inhabitants.

Culture 

Regarded as the historical capital of Kosovo, Prizren has been home to many different religions and cultures for centuries, shaping the cultural heritage of the city. Prizren is also considered as a museum city with many mosques, churches and old buildings of national importance. The Fortress of Prizren located above the Prizren River has seen habitation and use throughout different periods since the Bronze Age. Among the artifacts of the Middle Ages are the Sinan Pasha Mosque, Our Lady of Perpetual Succour Cathedral, Holy Saviour Church, Katip Sinan Qelebi Mosque, Holy Archangels Monastery, St. Nicholas Church, Muderiz Ali Effendi Mosque and the UNESCO World Heritage Site Our Lady of Ljeviš.

The annual Dokufest International Film Festival held in Prizren is considered among the largest publicly attended film festival in the Balkans. Several art and music festivals and conferences are held in the city, including the 40BunarFest and NGOM Fest, with the main objectives to promote artists and to connect the different ethnic groups in the surrounding region.

Sports 

The city has one sports club known as KF Liria based in Prizren near Kosovo. They currently play in the Football Superleague of Kosovo. The city is also home to one of the best basketball teams in Kosovo, K.B Bashkimi. They are currently playing in the top professional men's basketball league in Kosovo, Kosovo Basketball Superleague

See also 
 List of people from Prizren
 List of monuments in Prizren

Notes

References

Bibliography

External links 

Municipality of PrizrenOfficial Website

 
Prizren
Prizren
Populated places in Prizren District
Cities in ancient Illyria
Gegëri
Illyrian Kosovo
Mass murder in 1912
Roman towns and cities in Kosovo
Former capitals of Serbia